The Ministry of Muslim Religious Affairs is a ministry in the Government of Sri Lanka, that represent the Sri Lankan Muslims. As of December 2019, there is no responsible minister for this ministry.

List of Muslim Religious Affairs Ministers

The Minister of Muslim Religious Affairs is an appointment in the Cabinet of Sri Lanka and representing the minority religion Islam. The post was created on 21 January 2015 under the Sirisena government.

Parties

References

External links
Government of Sri Lanka

 
Muslim Religious Affairs
Muslim Religious Affairs